The 2023 O'Byrne Cup was a Gaelic football tournament played by eleven county teams of Leinster GAA in January 2023; Kilkenny did not take part.  were the holders.

The competition was marred by a series of cancelled games, as four teams gave walkovers in the later rounds, saying that they did not have enough players available, with the Sigerson Cup and other competitions going on. Leinster GAA stated that "the integrity of the competition has now been diminished. In future, counties will have to give serious consideration to their fixture schedule before committing to participating."

Competition format

The eleven teams are drawn to play in two groups of four teams and one group of three teams.

Each team plays the other teams in their group once. Two points are awarded for a win and one for a draw.

The three group winners advance to the knockout stage, with one of the winners of a four-team group playing the winners of the three-team group in the semi-final, and the other four-team group winners advancing directly to the final.

Group stage
Games took place 4–11 January 2023.

Group A

Group B

Group C

Knockout stage

References

External links
Official site

OByrne Cup
OByrne Cup
O'Byrne Cup